During the 2003–04 Italian football season, Brescia Calcio competed in the Serie A.

Kit
Brescia's kit was manufactured by Italian sports retailer Kappa and sponsored by Banca Lombarda.

Squad

Transfers

Competitions

Serie A

League table

Results by round

Matches

Statistics

Players statistics

References

Brescia Calcio seasons
Brescia